The French Military Mission to Poland was an effort by France to aid the nascent Second Polish Republic after it achieved its independence in November 1918, at the end of the First World War. The aim was to provide aid during the Polish-Soviet War (1919–1921), and to create a strong Polish military to serve as a useful ally against Germany. It was an advisory body consisting of about 400 French officers attached to staffs of Polish units at various levels. Although the French mission was small numerically, its effect was substantial in improving the organisation and logistics of the Polish army. It worked in parallel with the smaller British Military Mission to Poland. It existed from 1918 to 1939.

Its first commander was French General Paul Prosper Henrys, previously the commander of French forces in the Balkans. The French mission, composed of 400 officer-instructors, met with much respect. The instructors, many of them centered on the Polish General Staff, were crucial in training the emerging Polish officer corps. The French effort was vital in improving the organisation of the newly formed Polish army, which up till 1919 used various manuals, organisation structures and equipment, mostly from the former partitioners armies. Among the French officers was the future President of France, Charles de Gaulle.

This mission should not be confused with the Interallied Mission to Poland, an improvised effort launched by David Lloyd George on 21 July 1920, at the height of the crisis before the Battle of Warsaw. The purpose of that mission was to send a number of high level personages from Britain and France to Poland in an attempt to influence Polish policy, possibly through effecting a change in government. They included French diplomat, Jean Jules Jusserand, Maxime Weygand, chief of staff to Marshal Ferdinand Foch (the Supreme Commander of the victorious Entente), and the British diplomat, Lord Edgar Vincent D'Abernon. The crucial Battle of Warsaw was won in the early days of August, before the mission could achieve anything of importance. The only tangible result was the installation of Weygand as an advisor to the Polish General Staff, where his role was negligible. Nevertheless, soon after the battle and for various political reasons, a myth arose that Weygand was the author of the Polish victory at Warsaw.

References

See also
 Blue Army
 Western betrayal

Polish–Soviet War
Military history of France
Second Polish Republic
France–Poland military relations
France–Soviet Union relations